Movila can refer to:

 Movila, Ialomița, a commune in Ialomiţa County, Romania
 Movila, a village in Niculești Commune, Dâmbovița County, Romania
 Movila, a village in Sălcioara Commune, Dâmbovița County, Romania
 Movila, the Romanian name for Mohylivka village, Lunka Commune, Hertsa Raion, Ukraine
 Movilă (surname)

See also 
 Movileni (disambiguation)
 Movilița (disambiguation)